Alain Claude Sulzer (born 17 February 1953) is a Swiss writer and translator. He was born in Riehen, near Basel. Sulzer became a librarian, but also translated from French, for example parts of Julien Green's diaries. As a journalist he wrote for various newspapers and magazines, including the NZZ. He has published more than ten books and has won a number of literary awards in the process, such as the Rauris Literature Prize (1984), or the Hermann-Hesse-Preis (2009).

Another novel Aus den Fugen has also met with critical and commercial success and is set to be translated into English. Die Jugend ist ein fremdes Land, was published in September 2017 by Kiepenheuer & Witsch.

He lives with his partner, the theater actor Georg Martin Bode, in Basel, Alsace and Berlin.

Awards
 1984 Rauris Literature Prize for Das Erwachsenengerüst
 2008 Prix Medicis Etranger for 
 2009 Hermann-Hesse-Literaturpreis for Privatstunden

Memberships
 2022

Works

English translations

French translations

Italian translations

Dutch translation

Finnish translation

References

Further reading

External links
 

Swiss male novelists
Writers from Basel-Stadt
1953 births
Living people
21st-century Swiss novelists
21st-century male writers
Prix Médicis étranger winners